The Kindra Creek, a watercourse that is part of the Murrumbidgee catchment within the Murray–Darling basin, is located in the Riverina and South West Slopes regions of New South Wales, Australia.

Course and features 
The creek descends  over its  course.

See also 

 List of rivers of New South Wales (A-K)
 Rivers of New South Wales

References

External links
Murrumbidgee Catchment Management Authority website
 

Rivers of New South Wales
Tributaries of the Murrumbidgee River
Rivers in the Riverina